Enrique Anselmo Klar Razon Jr. (born March 3, 1960) is a Filipino billionaire and the chairman and CEO of the Manila-listed company International Container Terminal Services, Inc. (ICTSI), the Philippine port-handling giant. He is also Chairman of Bloomberry Resorts Corp., developer of Solaire Resort and Casino, a US$1.2 billion integrated resort complex in the Philippines’ Entertainment City and Manila Water, the private concessionaire of Metropolitan Waterworks and Sewerage System that serves the more than 7 million population of the East Zone of Metro Manila and the Rizal Province.  ICT, BLOOM, MWC and APX are listed in the Philippine Stock Exchange.

In 2020, Forbes named Razon the third richest Filipino and the 565th individual in the world, with a personal wealth of $5.1 billion.

Biography
Razon came from a third generation Spanish-Filipino family involved in the business of marine cargo handling. He studied in college at De La Salle University in Manila, then began his business career thereafter.

In 1987, the Razon Group and the Soriano Group incorporated ICTSI, initially to bid for the Manila International Container Terminal (MICT) in the Philippines. After winning the MICT contract in 1988, Mr. Razon spearheaded the MICT's development program. ICTSI also operates nine other terminals in the Philippines.

After consolidating and strengthening its base and flagship operation at the MICT, ICTSI launched an international and domestic expansion program in 1994.

Razon's other investments are in power, mining, oil and gas exploration, and leisure facilities.

Enrique Razon owns MORE Power (MORE Electric and Power Corporation or Monte Oro Resources) in Iloilo that replaced Panay Electric Company (PECO) as Iloilo City's sole power distributor in 2019 through a legislative franchise.

Philanthropy
Razon tables the ICTSI Foundation, Inc., which oversees and implements the ICTSI Group's corporate social responsibility advocacies. He has been a long-time patron of Philippine golf in the country by way of the Philippine Golf Tour, backed by sports management company, Pilipinas Golf Tournaments Inc. (PGTI), where he is chairman. Razon likewise extends help to the country's amateur golf development through the ICTSI-The Country Club program supported by the ICTSI Foundation.

In 2003, Razon donated P50 million for DLSU's sports development. The P50 million pesos were broken down into the following: P25 million for equipment and facilities of the Enrique M. Razon Sports Complex, named after his father; P20 million for athletic scholarships; and P5 million for a sports solidarity fund.

References

1960 births
Living people
Filipino billionaires
Filipino people of Spanish descent
De La Salle University alumni
People named in the Pandora Papers